Priority Records is an American distribution company and record label known for artists including N.W.A, Ice-T, Jay-Z, Snoop Dogg, Big L, Silkk the Shocker and Westside Connection. It also distributed hip hop record labels including Death Row Records, Hoo-Bangin' Records, No Limit Records, Posthuman Records, Rap-A-Lot Records, Rawkus Records, Roc-A-Fella Records, Ruthless Records and Wu-Tang Records. According to Billboard, "few record labels were as important to the rise of West Coast hip hop as Priority Records."

Company history

Beginnings (1985–1996) 
The Los Angeles-based company (with no ties or relations to a previous Priority Records label that was a subsidiary of what was then CBS Records) was formed in 1985 by three former K-tel executives: Bryan Turner, Mark Cerami and Steve Drath. Initial funding was provided by R-tek, a company headed by former K-tel board members: Ray and Harold Kives, and their company took an initial 50% ownership in Priority. Priority bought out the R-tek interest in 1987.

Its first success came with novelty act the California Raisins. To support early operations, Priority Records licensed repertoire from others and released compilation albums using archive recordings while developing its own artist roster. Priority Records achieved success as an independent label by developing a precedent-setting "street-based" formula of underground marketing which bypassed mainstream radio. This approach allowed Priority to sell millions of records without entering into the fiercely competitive major label battles over radio airplay. Priority's strategic marketing team was developed by Vice President Alyssa Pisano, who led Priority's Marketing and Creative Services Department between 1987 and 1996. Priority's roster featured numerous gold, platinum and multi-platinum artists, including N.W.A, Ice Cube, MC Ren, Eazy-E, Master P, Snoop Dogg, Silkk the Shocker, Jay-Z, Paris, Mack 10, 504 Boyz, C-Murder, Mia X, Westside Connection, No Limit and Ice-T.

EMI acquisition (1996–2004) 
In the early 1990s, the label struck up a distribution deal with EMI, while continuing to operate independently. EMI bought a 50% stake in Priority in 1996, and the remainder in 1998. Despite EMI's full ownership, Priority continued to be independently managed company until 2001, when its operations were merged into EMI's major US subsidiary, Capitol Records. Priority was absorbed into Capitol Records in 2004 and ceased operations.

Relaunch (2006–2013) 
In late 2006, EMI revived Priority Records, and it was supposed to start releasing new records again but never did except for a couple compilation and greatest hits albums from the likes of N.W.A, Westside Connection, Mack 10, and Ice Cube. In 2009, Snoop Dogg was appointed creative chairman of the label; Priority released Snoop Dogg's tenth studio album, Malice N Wonderland on December 8, 2009. In July 2013, Priority was re-launched via a joint venture between Capitol Records and Insurgency Music.  Based at the Capitol Records Building in Los Angeles, the new Priority Records will be a producer centric label that focuses on a broader array of music genres, including electronic music as well as urban music.

Second relaunch (2015–present) 
In 2015, due to the success of the 2015 American biographical film Straight Outta Compton based on former Priority act N.W.A, Priority Records was relaunched one more time as a distributor. This time the focus was on new acts, including G Perico, Snoh Aalegra and Jonn Hart. In 2018 Priority Records partnered with TuneGO. Priority Records signed TuneGO Artist, Three Guests and distributed their album, 3G. Priority also signed Massachusetts rap group Bandits The Label and later went on to distribute DtheFlyest debut project "Dope Boy Diaries" which was executive produced by CruufromtheNorth and featured a hit single with rap superstar Lil Baby titled "Fugazi" (2018).

Artists
Former Priority Records artists

See also
List of record labels
Priority Records discography

References

External links 
 Official website of Priority Records
 "2002 Music Awards" by Anthony Mariani,  Fort Worth Weekly, June 13, 2002, retrieved June 29, 2006

Record labels established in 1985
Record labels disestablished in 2004
Record labels established in 2006
Re-established companies
American record labels
Hip hop record labels
Universal Music Group
Labels distributed by Universal Music Group
Gangsta rap record labels
1985 establishments in California
2004 disestablishments in California
2006 establishments in California